Mutiara Damansara station is a mass rapid transit station serving the suburb of Mutiara Damansara in Petaling Jaya, Selangor, Malaysia.

It is one of the stations on the MRT Kajang Line. The station was opened on 16 December 2016 when the first phase of the line was opened.

The station is located adjacent to the Mutiara Damansara commercial area where The Curve Shopping Centre, Royale Chulan Hotel, IKEA Damansara, Lotus's Mutiara Damansara and other buildings are located.

Station Features
The station adopts the standard elevated station design for the MRT Kajang Line, with two side platforms above the concourse level. The station is located above Persiaran Surian, with its supporting columns sited between the Persiaran Surian underpass and the at-grade Petaling Jaya-bound lanes of the road.

Station layout

Exits and entrances
Unlike most other elevated stations of the line, the Mutiara Damansara MRT station has four entrances, allowing it to be accessed from both sides of Persiaran Surian, both sides of Jalan PJU 7/1 as well as having a direct pedestrian link with neighbouring commercial buildings.

Bus Services

Feeder buses
With the opening of the MRT Sungai Buloh-Kajang Line, feeder buses also began operating linking the station with several housing areas in Mutiara Damansara, Damansara Perdana, Bandar Utama and Bukit Lanjan. The feeder buses operate from the station's feeder bus stops adjacent to the station, accessed via Entrance B and Entrance C of the station.

Other buses

Gallery

Station

Entrances

Pedestrian link to Surian Link

See also
 Cochrane MRT station, on the same line, connected to another IKEA store
MRT Kajang Line
Mutiara Damansara

References

External links

 Klang Valley Mass Rapid Transit website
 Unofficial information resource on the MRT

Rapid transit stations in Selangor
Sungai Buloh-Kajang Line
Railway stations opened in 2016